Pademangan is a port-associated subdistrict of North Jakarta, Indonesia. It stretches from the Sunda Kelapa Harbor on the east to the western area of Tanjung Priok Harbor to the east. Geographically, it is a plain with an average height of 75 centimeters above the high tide sea level.

Boundaries
Pademangan is bordered on the west by Sunda Kelapa Harbor, on the south by Kemayoran Railway, on the east by the Kali Ancol and Kali Japat canals, and on the north by Jakarta Bay.

Kelurahan (Administrative Villages)
The subdistrict of Pademangan is divided into three Kelurahan / Administrative Villages:
Pademangan Timur - area code 14410
Pademangan Barat - area code 14420
Ancol - area code 14430

History

Settlement of the 19th century was similarly port-focussed and thus was among the settled urban parts that suffered in the early 19th century severe malaria outbreak. This prompted building the Weltevreden, "well-contented", the new administrative heart of the city, which was at the time the city of Batavia.  Industry and associated housing, needing port direct connectivity followed for much of the 20th century. Development continues to focus on other districts where the land is easier to drain and thus less costly to build high-rise, whilst keeping a partially green, tree-rich prospect from many coastal locations along this shore.

List of important places

Ancol Cemetery
Ancol Taman Impian (Taman Impian Jaya Ancol)
Ancol Station
Sunda Kelapa Harbor
Mangga Dua
Jakarta International Expo

References 

Districts of Jakarta
North Jakarta